Fusus cygneus is a species of sea snail, a marine gastropod mollusk in the family Fasciolariidae, the spindle snails, the tulip snails and their allies.

This species is a nomen dubium.

References

cygneus
Gastropods described in 1852
Taxa named by Rodolfo Amando Philippi